The Cumans (or Kumans), also known as Polovtsians or Polovtsy (plural only, from the Russian exonym ), were a Turkic nomadic people from Central Asia comprising the western branch of the Cuman–Kipchak confederation who spoke the Cuman language.

Related to the Pecheneg, they inhabited a shifting area north of the Black Sea and along the Volga River known as Cumania, from which the Cuman–Kipchaks meddled in the politics of the Caucasus and the Khwarazmian Empire. The Cumans were fierce and formidable nomadic warriors of the Eurasian Steppe who exerted an enduring influence on the medieval Balkans. They were numerous, culturally sophisticated, and militarily powerful.

Many eventually settled west of the Black Sea, influencing the politics of Kievan Rus', the Galicia–Volhynia Principality, the Golden Horde Khanate, the Second Bulgarian Empire, the Kingdom of Serbia, the Kingdom of Hungary, Moldavia, the Kingdom of Georgia, the Byzantine Empire, the Empire of Nicaea, the Latin Empire and Wallachia, with Cuman immigrants becoming integrated into each country's elite. The Cumans also played a prominent role in the Fourth Crusade and in the creation of the Second Bulgarian Empire. Cuman and Kipchak tribes joined politically to create the Cuman–Kipchak confederation.    

The Cuman language is attested in some medieval documents and is the best-known of the early Turkic languages. The Codex Cumanicus was a linguistic manual written to help Catholic missionaries communicate with the Cuman people.

Names and etymology

Cuman 
Cuman appears in ancient Roman texts as the name of a fortress or gate. The Roman natural philosopher Pliny the Elder (who lived in the 1st century AD), mentions "a fortress, the name of which is Cumania, erected for the purpose of preventing the passage of the innumerable tribes that lay beyond" while describing the "Gates of Caucasus" (Derbent, or Darial Gorge),. The Greek philosopher Strabo (died  24 AD) refers to the Darial Gorge (also known as the Iberian Gates or the Caucasian Gates) as Porta Caucasica and Porta Cumana.

The original meaning of the endonym Cuman is unknown. It is also often unclear whether a particular name refers to the Cumans alone, or to both the Cumans and the Kipchaks, as the two tribes often lived side by side.

Most other Turkish-speaking people (as well as most Muslim sources) called the Cumans some variant of "Qipchaqs", while Armenians called them "Xartesk'ns". Qumans were primarily used by Byzantine authors (and a few Arab sources), while the name used in Rus' tended to be "Polovtsian".

In Turkic languages qu, qun, qūn, quman or qoman means "pale, sallow, cream coloured", "pale yellow", or "yellowish grey". While it is normally assumed that the name referred to the Cumans' hair, Imre Baski – a prominent Turkologist – has suggested that it may have other origins, including:
 the color of the Cumans' horses (i.e. cream tones are found among Central Asian breeds such as the Akhal-Teke);
 a traditional water vessel, known as a quman; or
 a Turkic word for "force" or "power".

Observing that the Hungarian exonym for Cumans – i.e. Kun, Kunok – appeared as Cunus, Cuni in the chronicles and was applied to earlier nomads such as Pechenegs or Oghuzes, György Györffy derived Kun from Huns, instead of Qun, which he kept separate from Kun. However, István Vásáry rejected Györffy's hypothesis and contended that "the Hungarian name of the Cumans must go back to one of their self-appellations, i.e. to Qun.

Cumania 
Even after the Cumans were no longer the dominant power in their territory, people still referred to the area as Cumania. The Moroccan traveler, Ibn Battuta  said of Cumania: "This wilderness is green and grassy with no trees, nor hills, high or low ... there is no means of travelling in this desert except in wagons." The Persian historian, Hamdallah Mustawfi (1281–1349), wrote that Cumania has a cold climate and that it has excellent pasturage and numerous cattle and horses. The 14th-century Travels of Sir John Mandeville, note that Cumania

Polovtsy 
Polovtsy or Polovec is often said to be derived from the Old East Slavic polovŭ (половъ) "yellow; pale" by the Russians – all meaning "blond". The old Ukrainian word polovtsy (Пóловці), derived from polovo "straw" – means "blond, pale yellow". The western Cumans, or Polovtsy, were also called Sorochinetses by the Rus', – apparently derived from the Turkic sary chechle "yellow-haired". A similar etymology may have been at work in the name of the Śārī, who also migrated westward ahead of the Qun. However, according to O. Suleymenov polovtsy may come from a Slavic word for "blue-eyed", i.e. the Serbo-Croatian plȃv (пла̑в) means "blue", but this word also means "fair, blonde" and is in fact a cognate of the above; cf. West Slavic Polish płowy ,Eastern Slavic polovŭ, Russian polóvyj (поло́вый), Ukrainian polovýj (полови́й). Blonde individuals likely existed among the Kipchaks, yet anthropologically speaking the majority of Turkic peoples had East Asian admixture and generally Kimeks–Kipchaks were dark-haired and brown-eyed. Polish, Russian pole), which would therefore imply that  were "men of the field" or "men of the steppe" in contrast to the Lipovtsi.

Folban, Vallani, Valwe 
In Germanic languages, the Cumans were called Folban, Vallani or Valwe – all derivatives of Proto-Germanic root *falwa- meaning "pale" (> English "fallow"). In the German account by Adam of Bremen, and in Matthaios of Edessa, the Cumans were referred to as the "Blond Ones".

Kipchak 
As stated above, it is unknown whether the name Kipchak referred only to the Kipchaks proper, or to the Cumans as well. The two tribes eventually fused, lived together and probably exchanged weaponry, culture and languages; the Cumans encompassed the western half of the confederation, while the Kipchaks and (presumably) the Kangli/Kankalis (possibly connected to three Pecheneg tribes known collectively as Kangars) encompassed the eastern half. This confederation and their living together may have made it difficult for historians to write exclusively about either nation.

The Kipchaks' folk-etymology posited that their name meant 'hollow tree'; according to them, inside a hollow tree, their original human ancestress gave birth to her son. Németh points to the Siberian qıpčaq "angry, quick-tempered" attested only in the Siberian Sağay dialect. Klyashtorny links Kipchak to qovï, qovuq "unfortunate, unlucky"; yet Golden sees a better match in qïv "good fortune" and adjectival suffix -čāq. Regardless, Golden notes that the ethnonym's original form and etymology "remain a matter of contention and speculation".

Tribes 
Kievan Rus', Mamluk, Hungarian, and Chinese sources preserved the names of many Cuman-Kupchak tribal groupings: Altun-oba, Arslan-opa, Ay-opa, Badač, Barat ~ Beret ~ Baraq, Baya(w)ut, Burčoğli (R. Burchebichi; Hg. Borcsol), B.zângî ~ B.zânrî (< ? *Buranlï "stormy"), Čağraq ~ Čoğraq ~ Čağraq, Čenegrepa (< Mong. čengkir "light blue, bluish"), Čitey(oğlï) (R. Chitѣyebichi), Čirtan ~ (*Ozur) Čortan (Hg. Csertan), Dorut ~ Dörüt ~ Dört, Enčoğlï ~ İlančuglï (Hg. Iloncsuk), İt-oba, Qitan-opa, Knn (?) (either corrupted from Köten, R. Kotianъ, Hg. Kötöny; or from Turkic tribal name Keyit, meaning "to irritate, to annoy"), Küčeba ~ Küčcöba (R. Kouchebichi), Küčet, Kor ~ Qor (H. Kór), Qara Börklü, Qay-opa (R. Kaepiči), Qol-oba ~ Qul-oba (R. Kolobichi ~ Kulobichi), Qmngû/Qumanlu, Qonğuroğlı (H. Kongur), Mekrüti ~ Bekrüti ~ Bekürte, Mingüzoğlı, Orunqu(t) (from Mong. oroŋğu "small, brown-colored gazelle"), Ölberli(ğ) ~ Ölperli(ğ) (Ar. al-b.rlū ~ al-b.rlī, R. Olperliu(ie)ve, Olbѣry, Olьbery, Ch. Yuliboli (玉里伯里), Lt. reges Uilperitorum, from Mg. ölöbür "ill, infirm" or Tk. *alp-erlü), Ören ~ Uran, Pečeneg, Shanmie gumali (苫滅古麻里), Tarğïl (R. Targolove), Tarew (R. Tarьevskyi), Terter ~ Teriter-oba (R. Terьterobic

hi), Toqsoba (R. Toksobichi), Tğ Yšqût (*Tağ Bašqurt?), Ulašoğlï (R. Ulashebichi; Hg. Olás), Urus-oba (R. Ourusoba; from endonym *Aoruša of Turkicized Alans, compare Greek: Αορσοι or from Turkic urus "collision, fight"), Yimek ~ Yemek (R. Polovtsi Yemiakove), Yete-oba (R. Yetebichi), Yuğur, Moguty, Tatrany, Revugy, Shelьbiry, Topchaki (whom, Baskakov thought, belonged to the Chorni Klobuky), Elьborili, Kotan, Bekoba, Quyçï (R. Куичия, Kuichiya, meaning "shepherd"), etc.

Seven of these – Toqsoba (meaning either "plump leather bottle" or "nine clans", compare Toquz Oghuz "nine tribes"), Borcsol ("Pepper Sons"), Csertan ("pike"), Olás ("union, federation"), Kór ~ Kól ("little, few"), Iloncsuk ("little snake"), and Koncsog ("leather trouser") – eventually settled in Hungary.

History

Origins 

The original homeland of the Cumans is unknown before their eventual settlement in the Eurasian steppe's western part.

Qun 
Chinese authors mentioned a Tiele tribe named 渾 (Mand. Hún (< MC *ɦuon), possibly a transcription of underlying *Qun) located north of the Tuul River. The writings of al-Marwazi (c. 1120) state that a Turkic "Qun" people came from the northern Chinese borders – "the land of Qitay" (possibly during a part of a migration from further east). After leaving the lands of the Khitans (possibly due to the Khitans' expansion), the Qun entered the territory of the Śari people, whom the Quns expelled. Marwazi wrote that the Qun were Nestorian Christians. Golden surmised that these Quns might have sprung "from that same conglomeration of Mongolic peoples from which the Qitañ sprang"; however, Golden later suggested that the Quns were Turkic. Despite this, it is possible that certain tribes forming a part of the Cuman-Kipchak conglomerate were of Mongolic origin. Golden considers the Ölberli to have originally been Mongolic-speaking and argues that they were pushed westwards as a result of socio-political changes among the Khitans. The Syrian historian Yaqut (1179–1229) also mentions the Qun in The Dictionary of Countries, where he notes that "(the sixth iqlim) begins where the meridian shadow of the equinox is seven, six-tenths, and one-sixth of one-tenth of a foot. Its end exceeds its beginning by only one foot. It begins in the homeland of the Qayi, Qun, Khirkhiz, Kimak, at-Tagazgaz, the lands of the Turkomans, Fārāb, and the country of the Khazars." The Armenian historian, Matthew of Edessa (died 1144), also mentioned the Cumans, using the name χarteš, meaning "blond", "pale", "fair".

Kipchak relationship 
It cannot be established whether the Cumans conquered the Kipchaks, if the Śari whom the Quns had defeated were to be identified as Kipchaks, or whether they simply represent the western mass of largely Kipchak-Turkic speaking tribes. The Quns and Śari (whom Czeglédy (1949:47-48,50) identifies with Yellow Uyghurs) were possibly induced into the Kimek union or took over said union and absorbed the Kimek. As a result, the Kipchaks presumably replaced the Kimeks as the union's dominant group, while the Quns gained ascendancy over the westernmost tribes and became Quman (though difficulties remain with the Qun-Cuman link and how Qun became Cuman, e.g. qun + man "the real Quns"? > *qumman > quman?). Kimeks were still represented amongst the Cuman–Kipchaks as Yimek ~ Yemek.

Potapov writes that:

Conquests
The Cumans entered the grasslands of the present-day southern Russian steppe in the 11th century AD and went on to assault the Byzantine Empire, the Kingdom of Hungary, the Principality of Pereyaslavl and Kievan Rus'. The Cumans' entry into the area pressed the Oghuz Turks to shift west, which in turn caused the Pechenegs to move to the west of the Dnieper River. Cuman and Rus' attacks contributed to the departure of the Oghuz from the steppes north of the Black Sea. Mahmud al-Kashgari, writing in 1076, says that in the east Cuman territory bordered a town near Talas. The Cumans first entered the Bugeac (Bessarabia) at some point around 1068–1078. They launched a joint expedition with the Pechenegs against Adrianople in 1078. During that same year the Cumans were also fighting the Rus'. The Russian Primary Chronicle mentions Yemek Cumans who were active in the region of Volga Bulgaria.

Political organization
The vast territory of the Cuman–Kipchak realm consisted of loosely connected tribal units that represented a dominant military force but were never politically united by a strong central power; the khans acted on their own initiative. The Cuman–Kipchaks never established a state, instead forming a Cuman–Kipchak confederation (Cumania/Desht-i Qipchaq/Zemlja Poloveckaja (Polovcian Land)/Pole Poloveckoe (Polovcian Plain)), which stretched from the Danube in the west to Taraz, Kazakhstan in the east. This was possibly due to their facing no prolonged threat before the Mongol invasion, and it may have either prolonged their existence or quickened their destruction. 

Robert Wolff states that it was discipline and cohesion that permitted the Cuman–Kipchaks to conquer such a vast territory. Al-Idrīsī states that Cumania got its name from the city of Cumania; he wrote, "From the city of Khazaria to the city of Kirait is 25 miles. From there to Cumanie, which has given its name to the Cumans, it is 25 miles; this city is called Black Cumania. From the city of Black Cumania to the city of Tmutorakan (MaTlUqa), which is called White Cumania, it is 50 miles. White Cumania is a large inhabited city ... Indeed, in this fifth part of the seventh section there is the northern part of the land of Russia and the northern part of the land of Cumania ... In this sixth part there is a description of the land of Inner Cumania and parts of the land of Bulgaria."

According to the 12th-century Jewish traveler Petachiah of Regensburg "they have no king, only princes and royal families". Cumans interacted with the Rus' principalities, Bulgaria, the Byzantine Empire, and the Wallachian states in the Balkans; with Armenia and the Kingdom of Georgia (see Kipchaks in Georgia) in the Caucasus; and with the Khwarezm Empire in Central Asia. The Cumans-Kipchaks constituted an important element and were closely associated with the Khwarazmian royal house via marital alliances. The Cumans were also active in commerce with traders from Central Asia to Venice. 

The Cumans had a commercial interest in Crimea, where they also took tribute from Crimean cities. A major area of commerce was the ancient city of Sudak, which Ibn al-Air viewed as the "city of the Qifjaq from which (flow) their material possessions. It is on the Khazar Sea. Ships come to it bearing clothes. The Qifjiqs buy from them and sell them slaves. Burtas furs, beaver, squirrels..." Due to their political dominance, the Cuman language became Crimea's lingua franca. Thus the language was adopted by the Karaite Jewish and Crimean Armenian communities (who produced many documents written in Kipchak with the Armenian alphabet), where it was preserved for centuries up to the modern day.

Battles in Kievan Rus' and the Balkans 

The Cumans first encountered the Rus' in 1055, when they advanced towards the Rus' Pereyaslavl principality, but Prince Vsevolod reached an agreement with them thus avoiding a military confrontation. In 1061, however, the Cumans, under the chieftain Sokal, invaded and devastated the Pereyaslavl principality; this began a war that would go on for 175 years. In 1068 at the Battle of the Alta River, the Cumans defeated the armies of the three sons of Yaroslav the Wise, Grand Prince Iziaslav I of Kiev, Prince Sviatoslav of Chernigov, and Prince Vsevolod of Pereyaslavl. After the Cuman victory, they repeatedly invaded Kievan Rus', devastating the land and taking captives, who became either their slaves or were sold at markets in the south. The most vulnerable regions were the Principality of Pereyaslavl, the Principality of Novgorod-Seversk and the Principality of Chernigov.

The Cumans initially managed to defeat the Grand Prince Vladimir II Monomakh of Kievan Rus' in 1093 at the Battle of the Stugna River, but they were defeated later by the combined forces of Rus principalities led by Monomakh and were forced out of the Rus' borders to the Caucasus. In these battles some Pecheneg and Oghuz groups were liberated from the Cumans and incorporated into the Rus' border-guard system. Khan Boniak launched invasions on Kiev in 1096, 1097, 1105, and 1107.

In 1096, Boniak attacked Kiev and burned down the princely palace in Berestove; he also plundered the Kievan Cave Monastery. Boniak was defeated near Lubny in 1107 by the forces of the Kievan Rus' princes. The Cumans led by Boniak crushed the Hungarian army led by Coloman in 1099 and seized the royal treasury. In 1109, Monomakh launched another raid against the Cumans and captured "1000 tents". In 1111, 1113, and 1116, further raids were launched against the Cumans and resulted in the liberation and incorporation of more Pecheneg and Oghuz tribes.

In 1092, the Cumans resumed their raids against the Rus' and also attacked the Kingdom of Poland: and reportedly reached northern cities located in Lithuania. In 1094-1095 the Cumans, led by Tugorkan, in support of the exiled Byzantine pretender Constantine Diogenes (as a pretext to plundering), invaded the Balkans and conquered the Byzantine province of Paristrion. The Cumans then advanced all the way to Adrianople and Anchialos but could not conquer them. In the following years, when knights of the First Crusade were passing through the empire, Byzantium offered the Cumans prestige titles and gifts in order to appease them; subsequently good relations ensued. From 1097-1099, Sviatopolk II of Kiev requested help from the Cumans against Coloman, King of Hungary, who was involved in a feud with Volodar of Peremyshl, Prince of Przemyśl. King Coloman and his army crossed the Carpathian Mountains and laid siege on Przemyśl, which prompted David Igorevich, an ally of Volodar Rostislavich, to persuade the Cumans, under Khan Boniak and Altunopa, to attack the Magyars.

On 20 March 1155, Prince Gleb Yuryevich took Kiev with the help of a Cuman army under the Cuman prince Chemgura. By 1160 Cuman raids into Rus' had become an annual event. These attacks put pressure on Rus' and affected trade routes to the Black Sea and Constantinople, in turn leading Rus' to again attempt action. Offenses were halted during 1166–1169, when Grand prince Andrey Bogolyubsky, son of Khan Ayepa's daughter, took control of Kiev in 1169 and installed Gleb as his puppet. Gleb brought in "wild" Cumans as well as Oghuz and Berendei units. Later, the princes of the Principality of Chernigov attempted to use Khan Konchek's army against Kievan Rus' and Suzdal. This Chernigov-Cuman alliance suffered a disastrous defeat in 1180; Elrut, Konchek's brother died in battle. In 1177, a Cuman army that was allied with Ryazan sacked six cities that belonged to the Berendei and Torkil. In 1183, the Rus' defeated a large Cuman army and captured Khan Kobiak (Kobek) as well as his sons and other notables.

Subsequently, Khan Konchek concluded negotiations. Like his son Khan Köten, preceding the Mongol invasion, Khan Konchek was successful in creating a more cohesive force out of the many Cuman groups – he united the western and eastern Cuman–Kipchak tribes. Khan Konchek also changed the old Cuman system of government whereby rulership went to the most senior tribal leader; he instead passed it on to his son Koten. Igor Svyatoslavich, prince of the Principality of Novgorod-Seversk, attacked the Cumans in the vicinity of the Kayala river in 1185 but was defeated; this battle was immortalized in the Rus' epic poem The Tale of Igor's Campaign, and Alexander Borodin's opera, Prince Igor. The dynamic pattern of attacks and counterattacks between the Rus' and the Cumans indicates that both rarely, if ever, were able to attain the unity needed to deal a fatal blow. The Cuman attacks on the Rus' often had Caucasian and Danubian European implications.

In the Balkans, the Cumans were in contact with all the statal entities. They fought with the Kingdom of Hungary, allied with the Bulgarians of the Second Bulgarian Empire (they were the empire's most effective military component) and with the Vlachs against the Byzantine Empire. A variant of the oldest Turkic chronicle, Oghuzname (The Oghuz Khan's Tale), mentions the Cumans fighting the Magyars, Rus', Romanians (Ulak), and Bashkirs, who had refused to submit to their authority.

In alliance with the Bulgarians and Vlachs, the Cumans are believed to have played a significant role in the uprising led by brothers Asen and Peter of Tarnovo, resulting in victory over Byzantium and the restoration of Bulgaria's independence in 1185. István Vásáry states that without the active participation of the Cumans, the Vlakho-Bulgarian rebels could never have gained the upper hand over the Byzantines, and ultimately without the military support of the Cumans, the process of Bulgarian restoration could never have been realised. 

The Cuman participation in the creation of the Second Bulgarian Empire in 1185 and thereafter brought about basic changes in the political and ethnic sphere of Bulgaria and the Balkans. The Cumans were allies in the Bulgarian–Latin Wars with emperor Kaloyan of Bulgaria. In 1205, at the Battle of Adrianople (1205), 14,000 Cuman light cavalry contributed to Kaloyan's crushing victory over the Latin Crusaders.

Cuman troops continued to be hired throughout the 13th and 14th century by both the Bulgarians and Byzantines. The Cumans who remained east and south of the Carpathian Mountains established a county named Cumania, which was a strong military base in an area consisting of parts of Moldavia and Wallachia.

Mongol invasions 

Like most other peoples of medieval Eastern Europe, the Cumans put up a resistance against the relentlessly advancing Mongols led by Jebe and Subutai. The Mongols crossed the Caucasus mountains in pursuit of Muhammad II, the shah of the Khwarezmid Empire, and met and defeated the Cumans in Subcaucasia in 1220. The Cuman khans Danylo Kobiakovych and Yurii Konchakovych died in battle, while the other Cumans, commanded by Khan Köten, managed to get aid from the Rus' princes.

As the Mongols were approaching Russia, Khan Köten fled to the court of his son-in-law, Prince Mstislav the Bold of Galich, where he gave "numerous presents: horses, camels, buffaloes and girls. And he presented these gifts to them, and said the following, 'Today the Mongols took away our land and tomorrow they will come and take away yours'." The Cumans were ignored for almost a year, however, as the Rus' had suffered from their raids for decades. But when news reached Kiev that the Mongols were marching along the Dniester River, the Rus' responded. Mstislav of Galich then arranged a council of war in Kiev, which was attended by Mstislav Romanovich, Prince Yuri II of Vladimir-Suzdal and Mstislav Svyatoslavich of Chernigov. 

The princes promised support to Khan Koten's Cumans and an alliance between the Rus' and Cumans was formed. It was decided that the Rus' and Cumans would move east to seek and destroy any Mongols they found. The Rus' princes then began mustering their armies and moved towards the rendezvous point. The army of the alliance of the Rus' and Cumans numbered around 80,000. When the alliance reached Pereyaslavl, they were met by a Mongol envoy that tried to persuade them not to fight. This as well as a second attempt by the Mongols failed; the alliance then crossed the Dnieper River and marched eastward for nine days pursuing a small Mongol contingent, unknowingly being led by a false retreat. The battle took place near the Kalka River in 1223. 

Due to confusion and mistakes, and the superb military tactics and fighting-qualities of the Mongols, the Rus' and Cumans were defeated. In the chaos the Cumans managed to retreat, but the Rus' failed to regroup and were crushed. The Cumans were allied at Kalka River with Wallach warriors named Brodnics, led by Ploscanea. Brodnics' territory was in the lower parts of the Prut river in modern Romania and Moldova. During the second Mongol invasion of Eastern Europe in 1237–1240 the Cumans were defeated again; at this time groups of Cumans went to live with the Volga Bulgars, who had not been attacked yet.

Istvan Vassary states that after the Mongol conquest, "A large-scale westward migration of the Cumans began." Certain Cumans also moved to Anatolia, Kazakhstan and Turkmenistan. In the summer of 1237 the first wave of this Cuman exodus appeared in Bulgaria. The Cumans crossed the Danube, and this time Tsar Ivan Asen II could not tame them, as he had often been able to do earlier; the only possibility left for him was to let them march through Bulgaria in a southerly direction. They proceeded through Thrace as far as Hadrianoupolis and Didymotoichon, plundering and pillaging the towns and the countryside, just as before. The whole of Thrace became, as Akropolites put it, a "Scythian desert."

A direct attack on Cumania came only in 1238–1239, and encountered serious resistance by various Cuman khans. The final blow came in 1241, when Cuman control over the Pontic steppes ended and the Cuman–Kipchak confederation ceased to exist as a political entity, with the remaining Cuman tribes being dispersed, either becoming subjects and mixing with their Mongol conquerors, as part of what was to be known as the Golden Horde (Kipchak Khanate) and Nogai Horde, or fleeing to the west, to the Byzantine Empire, the Second Bulgarian Empire, and the Kingdom of Hungary, where they integrated into the elite and became kings and nobles with many privileges. Other Cuman captives were sold as slaves, who would go on to become Mamluks in Egypt, who would attain the rank of Sultan or hold regional power as emirs or beys. Some of these Mamluks led by Sultan Baibars would fight the Mongols again, defeating them at the Battle of Ain Jalut and the Battle of Elbistan.

A group of Cumans under two leaders named Jonas and Saronius, the former of whom was higher in rank, entered the Latin Empire of Constantinople as allies about 1240, probably fleeing the Mongols. The name Saronius (found in Alberic of Trois-Fontaines, who calls the leaders kings) is probably a corruption of the Cuman name Sïčgan, meaning "mouse". They assisted the Emperor Baldwin II in the capture of Tzurullon from the Nicaeans in that year. The following year the Christian daughters of Saronius married two of the leading noblemen of the empire, Baldwin of Hainaut and William of Meri, while Jonas's daughter married Narjot III de Toucy, who had once served as regent of the empire in Baldwin's absence. When Narjot died in 1241, his wife became a nun. Jonas died that same year and was buried in a tumulus outside Constantinople in a pagan ceremony. According to Aubrey, eight volunteer warriors and twenty-six horses were sacrificed at the funeral.

Cuman migration of the Hungarian plain, Balkans and Anatolia 

They became one of the important Turkic groups in Desht-i Kipchak region. After Kipchak unity was destroyed by the Mongol attack in 1239, one branch of the Cumans migrated to the Balkans, and another branch went down to the Anatolia. They later came into contact with Georgians, Hungarians and Turks.

The architect of the Georgian-Cuman relations was the David IV of Georgia. This event, which was one of the most important military reforms of David's against the Seljuk invaders, took place when a high-level Georgian delegation visited the Cuman headquarters. To strengthen this alliance with the nomads, David married with Cuman King Atrak's daughter Guranduht, and invited her relatives to settle in Georgia. David brokered a truce between the Kipchaks and Alans. Later on he has held some consultations with Vladimir II Monomakh, Grand Duke of Kiev who defeated Atrak in 1109, to ensure free passage of nomadic tribes into Georgia.

King Andrew II of Hungary granted the Burzenland region to the Teutonic Knights in 1211. The Teutonic Knights campaigned against the Cumans. However, the Teutonic Knights failed to defeat the Cumans and began to establish a country independent of the King of Hungary. In 1238, after Mongol attacks on Cumania, King Béla IV of Hungary offered refuge to the remainder of the Cuman people under their leader Khan Köten, who in turn vowed to convert his 40,000 families to Christianity. King Béla hoped to use the new subjects as auxiliary troops against the Mongols, who were already threatening Hungary. Cumans were joined by the Iranian Jasz people, who had been living with the Cumans. Batu Khan of the Mongols then ordered Bela to stop giving refuge to the Cumans and made a particular point that if attacked the Cumans could easily run away, for they were skilled horseman, but not so for the Hungarians, who were a sedentary nation and had no such luxury. Bela rejected this ultimatum.After crushing defeats and facing complete collapse, the Hungarians engaged in a suicidal betrayal of the Cumans, the people that had done the most in repelling the Mongols. Some of the barons went to Köten's house with the intent of killing him as scapegoat or handing him over to the Mongols, possibly believing the Cuman–Kipchaks were Mongol spies.

However, the barons had Köten assassinated in Pest on 17 March 1241. When news of this outrage reached the Cuman camp there was an eruption of "Vesuvian intensity". In revenge for this victimization they slaughtered a vast number of Hungarians. Cumans then left for the Balkans and the Second Bulgarian Empire, going on a rampage of destruction through Hungary "equal to that which Europe had not experienced since the incursions of the Mongols".

In 1239-1240, a large group of Cumans fleeing from the Mongols crossed the Danube. This group, which has an estimated population of over 10 thousand, wandered for a long time to find a suitable place to settle in Thrace. John III Doukas Vatatzes  who wanted to prevent Cumans invasion of Byzantine lands and to benefit from their military capabilities invited Cumans in Byzantine service. He settled some of them in Anatolia (what is now Turkey), to protect Byzantine from foreign invasions. When the Ottomans conquered the lands they lived in, these Cumans intermixed with the Turkmen and were assimilated among Turks. Today there are still villages in Turkey, Kazakhstan and Ukraine founded by Cumans. while the Cumanian settlements in Hungary were destroyed during the Turkish wars in the 16th and 17th centuries.

This prayer, which was translated into the Cuman language in order to Christianize Shamanist Cumans in Hungary, was recorded in the TRT Documentary Özü Türk program:

Cuman involvement in Serbia 
Cuman involvement in Serbia first occurred as a result of marital ties between Serbia and Hungary. King Stephen V of Hungary gave his daughter, Catherine (whose mother was Queen Elizabeth the Cuman, daughter of the Cuman chieftain Seyhan) in marriage to Stefan Dragutin, son of King Stefan Uroš I of Serbia. King Uroš had promised both his son and King Stephen that he would make Dragutin king during his own lifetime; but he later declined this. Dragutin, in disappointment, requested aid from King Stephen, who said he would lend his Hungarian and Cuman troops. Subsequently, Dragutin set out with his troops and marched on his father. King Uroš had declined once more, and in 1276 Dragutin clashed with his father's army in Gacko, winning the battle. Afterwards, Dragutin took the throne and became king of Serbia. After King Stephen's death, his son, Ladislaus IV the Cuman, continued to support Dragutin, his brother-in-law. From 1270 onwards Cuman mercenaries and auxiliaries were present on both sides of the warring factions, sometimes ignoring the orders of the party they were fighting for, instead acting on their own and looting the countryside. The Cumans had also burned down Žiča, the former see of the archbishopric of the Serbian Church.

By 1272, the region of Braničevo in Serbia had become a Hungarian banate, but soon afterwards, its rulers, Kudelin and Darman succeeded in making it an independent state. Kudelin and Darman were either Cuman warriors in Bulgarian service or Bulgarian nobles of Cuman origin. This move to independence had angered Ladislaus IV as well as Dragutin, who wanted to crush the rebellion. Darman and Kudelin were supported by the Tatars of the Golden Horde (Kipchak Khanate) against the Hungarians and Serbs. Subsequently, Dragutin attacked the brothers but failed to defeat them. After this attack the brothers hired Cuman and Tatar mercenaries. Dragutin in turn went to his brother, King Milutin for help. Dragutin battled the brothers again, this time with King Milutin's help as well as support from King Ladislaus IV (Cuman troops), and defeated them. After this King Ladislaus continued negotiations with Darman and Kudelin, but this had failed so he sent Transylvanian and Cuman troops against them. The Cumans had fought on both the Bulgarian and Hungarian-Serbian sides.

The Cumans were also involved with the semi-independent Bulgarian Tsardom of Vidin between 1290 and 1300, which had become a target of Serbian expansion. In 1280 the Cuman noble, Shishman, became ruler of Vidin. He was perhaps granted the position of despot of Vidin soon after the accession of another Bulgarian noble of Cuman origin, Tsar George Terter I (r. 1280–1292), to the Bulgarian throne in 1280. Shishman was either a close relative or a brother of George Terter I. Shishman may have established his authority over the Vidin region as early as the 1270s, after the death of the previous ruler of that area, Jacob Svetoslav. Danilo, a Serbian archbishop, reported, "At that time in the land of the Bulgars a prince called Shishman emerged. He lived in the town of Vidin, and obtained the adjacent countries and much of the Bulgarian land." Some years after, Shishman invaded Serbia and got as far as Hvosno. After failing to capture Ždrelo, he returned to Vidin, which was subsequently attacked and devastated by King Milutin. However, Milutin replaced him on his throne on the basis that he would become Shishman's ally. In fact, the alliance was strengthened by Shishman marrying the daughter of the Serbian grand župan Dragos. Further security came about when Milutin later gave his daughter Anna as a wife to Shishman's son Michael, who in 1323 became Tsar of Bulgaria.

Golden Horde and Byzantine mercenaries 

The Cumans who remained scattered in the prairie of what is now southwest Russia joined the Mongol Golden Horde Khanate, and their descendants became assimilated with local populations including the Mongols (Tatars). The cultural heritage of those Cuman–Kipchaks who remained was transferred to the Mongols, whose élite adopted many of the traits, customs, and language of the Cumans and Kipchaks; the Cumans, Kipchaks, and Mongols finally became assimilated through intermarriage and became the Golden Horde. Those Cumans, with the Turko-Mongols, adopted Islam in the second half of the 13th and the first half of the 14th century.

In 1071, Cumans participated in the Battle of Manzikert as mercenaries in the Byzantine army against the Seljuks. Emperor Romanus had sent the Cumans and Franks to secure the fortress of Ahlat on the shore of Lake Van. The Cumans, who did not receive their pay, later defected to the Seljuks. In 1086 Cumans devastated Byzantine settlements in the Balkans. Later the Cumans joined the Pechenegs and the former Hungarian king, Salomon, in plundering the Byzantine Balkan provinces. Subsequent to this, the Cumans gave aid to Tatos, the chief of Distra. In 1091 there was a disagreement in plunder shares between the Cumans and Pechenegs, which resulted in a breach between the two peoples; this contributed to the Cumans (led by Togortok/Tugorkan and Boniak, who had repeatedly raided Kievan Rus') joining Alexios I Komnenos against the Pechenegs in the Battle of Levounion. 

A couple of weeks afterwards the Cumans invaded the Balkans. After the Battle of Kalka River a large group with an estimated population of over 10,000 Cumans invaded Thrace where they pillaged towns that had recently come under the control of the Nicaean Empire. This continued until 1242 when Nicaean emperor John III Doukas Vatatzes, in response to the situation, won their favour with "gifts and diplomacy". Thereafter he succeeded in settling most of them in Anatolia throughout the Meander valley and the region east of Philadelphia. Most of these Cumans enrolled in the army and soon afterwards were baptized. Vatatzes' policy towards the Cumans was distinguished by its enormous scale and relatively successful outcome.

Cumans had served as mercenaries in the armies of the Byzantine Empire since the reign of Alexios I Komnenos (1081–1118) and were one of the most important elements of the Byzantine army until the mid-14th century. They served as light cavalry (horse-archers) and as standing troops; those in the central army were collectively called Skythikoi/Skythikon. Other Cumans lived a more dangerous life as highlanders on the fringes of the empire, possibly being involved in a mixture of agriculture and transhumance, acting as a buffer between Nicaean farmers and Turkic nomads. 

These Cumans were frequently mustered for Byzantine campaigns in Europe. In 1242 they were employed by Vatatzes in his siege of Thessaloniki. In 1256 emperor Theodore II Laskaris left a force of 300 Cumans with the Nicaean governor of Thessaloniki. In 1259, 2000 Cuman light cavalry fought for the Nicaean Empire at the Battle of Pelagonia. Cumans were again involved in 1261, where the majority of the 800 troops under Alexios Strategopoulos that retook Constantinople, were Cumans. Large Cuman contingents were also part of the Byzantine Emperor Michael VIII Palaiologos' European campaigns of 1263–1264, 1270–1272 and 1275. Cumans were again employed by emperor Andronikos II Palaiologos in 1292, in his campaign against the Despotate of Epirus. The Cumans, together with Turk mercenaries, terminated the campaign by an unauthorized retreat.

In contrast to their light cavalry counterparts, Cuman standing troops appear as a distinct group only once, albeit very significantly. During the election of Emperor Michael VIII Palaiologos to the regency in 1258, after the consultation of Latin mercenaries, the Cumans present at the court offered their opinion on the matter in "good Greek". This is indicative of the Cumans spending considerable time in the company of Greek speakers. The importance of this Cuman group came from its tendency to foster assimilation (Hellenization) and, through time, the social advancement of its members. An example of this influential group was Sytzigan (known as Syrgiannes after baptism), who before 1290 became Megas Domestikos (Commander-in-Chief of the Army) under Emperor Andronikos II. His son, Syrgiannes Palaiologos, attained the title of Pinkernes and was a friend of Andronikos III Palaiologos and John Kantakouzenos. An act from the archive of the Lavra of Athanasios mentions Cuman Stratioti (mercenaries from the Balkans) in the region of Almopia who received two douloparoikoi in 'pronoia' (a Byzantine form of feudalism based on government assignment of revenue-yielding property to prominent individuals in return for military service) some time before 1184.CultureHorses were central to Cuman culture and way of life, and their main activity was animal husbandry. The knight Robert de Clari described the Cumans as nomadic warriors who raised horses, sheep, goats, camels, and cattle. They moved north with their herds in summer and returned south in winter. Some of the Cumans led a semi-settled life and took part in trading and farming, as well as blacksmithing, furriery, shoe making, saddle making, bow making, and clothes making. 

They mainly sold and exported animals, mostly horses, and animal products. They attached feeding sacks to the bridles of their horses, allowing them to cover great distances. They could go on campaign with little baggage and carry everything they needed. They wore sheepskin and were armed with composite bows and arrows. They prayed to the first animal they saw in the morning. Like the Bulgars, the Cumans were known to drink blood from their horse (they would cut a vein) when they ran out of water far from an available source. Their traditional diet consisted of soup with millet and meat and included beer, curdled mare's milk, kumis, and bread (though bread could be rare depending on location).

The fundamental unit of Cuman society was the family, made up of blood relatives. A group of families formed a clan, led by a chief; a group of clans formed a tribe, led by a khan. A typical Cuman clan was named after an object, animal, or a leader of the clan. The names of the leaders of clans or tribes sometimes ended in "apa/aba". Cuman names were descriptive and represented a personal trait or an idea. Clans lived together in movable settlements named 'Cuman towers' by Kievan Rus' chroniclers.

The Cuman–Kipchak tribes formed sub-confederations governed by charismatic ruling houses – they acted independently of each other and had opposing policies. The territory controlled distinguished each Cuman tribe: the "seashore" Cuman tribes lived in the steppes between the mouths of the Dnieper and the Dniester; the "coastal" tribes lived on the coast of the Sea of Azov; the "Dnieper" tribes lived on both banks of the bend in the Dnieper Valley; and the "Don" Cumans lived in the Don River Valley. D. A. Rasovskii notes five separate independent Cuman groups: the central Asiatic, the Volga-Yayik (or Ural), the Donets-Don (between the Volga and the Dnieper), the lower course of the Dnieper, and the Danube. 

The Rus' grouped the Cuman–Kipchaks into two categories: the Non Wild Polvcians – 'civilised' Cumans of the western part of the Cuman–Kipchak confederation who had friendly relations with Kievan Rus' – and the Wild Polvcians  – who formed the eastern part of the confederation and who had hostile relations with Kievan Rus'. As the Cuman–Kipchaks gained more territory, they drove off or dominated many tribes – such as the Oghuz, various Iranian and Finnic tribes, Pechenegs, and Slavs. They also raided the Byzantine Empire and a few times joined the Normans from southern Italy and the Hungarians in doing so. Over the course of time feudalism would take over the traditional social structure of the Cumans, and this led to the changing of identity from kinship to territory-based. Some of the Cumans eventually settled and led sedentary lives involved in agriculture and crafts such as leather and iron working and weapon making. Others became merchants and traded from their towns along the ancient trade routes to regions such as the Orient, Middle East, and Italy.

The Cumans also played the role of middlemen in trade between Byzantium and the East, which passed through the Cuman-
controlled ports of Sudak (Surozh), Oziv, and Saksyn. Several land routes between Europe and the Near East ran through Cuman territories: the Zaloznyi, the Solianyi, and the Varangian. Cuman towns – Sharukan, Suhrov/Sugrov, and Balin – appeared in the Donets River Basin; they were also inhabitted by other peoples besides the Cumans. Due to the practice of Cuman towns being named after their khans, town names changed over time – the town of Sharukan appears as Osenev, Sharuk, and Cheshuev. Rock figures called stone babas, which are found throughout southern Ukraine and other areas on the steppes of Russia, were closely connected with the Cuman religious cult of shamanism. 

The Cumans tolerated all religions, and Islam and Christianity spread quickly among them. As they were close to the Kievan Rus' principalities, Cuman khans and important families began to slavicize their names – for example, Yaroslav Tomzakovych, Hlib Tyriievych, Yurii Konchakovych, and Danylo Kobiakovych. Ukrainian princely families were often connected by marriage with Cuman khans, lessening wars and conflicts. Sometimes the princes and khans waged joint campaigns; for example, in 1221 they attacked the trading town of Sudak on the Black Sea, which was held by the Seljuk Turks and which interfered with Rus'-Cuman trade.

The Cumans were reported to be handsome people with blond hair, fair skin and blue eyes, and desirable women. Cuman women had a high reputation for their beauty amongst the Russian aristocracy. Robert de Clari reported that the Cumans often wore a sleeveless sheepskin vest, usually worn in conjunction with bracers. Underneath the vest was worn a short or long sleeved tunic/tabard, extended to the mid calf, splitting in the front and back between the legs. Men wore trousers and a kaftan, each fastened by a belt, which was the traditional costume. 

The women also wore caftans, as well as pants, dresses, and tunics shorter than those worn by men, sometimes split along the front, back, and sides. Clothes were commonly coloured deep crimson for decoration. Cuman men wore distinguishing conical felt or leather hats, pointed at the top with a broad brim (if made of felt) or a fur trim around the base (if made of leather). The brim of the hat formed a sharp angle at the front and upturned on the rear and at the sides. Women wore a large variety of head dresses and also wore conical hats but with a felt top and a cloth veil extending down the back. 

This veil only covered the back neck and not the hair or face; another source states that it did cover the hair and that sometimes one or two braids were visible. Women wore a variety of jewellery, such as torques, a type of neck ornament consisting of one or several metal strands attached to a ribbon or necklace and hung around the neck, and head dresses that were made of a series of silver rings on a solid, cylindrically shaped material that was fastened at the temples. The men shaved the top of their head, while the rest of the hair was plaited into several braids; they also had prominent moustaches. Other Cumans also wore their hair very long, without shaving the top. The women had their hair loose or braided with buns twisting at the side. Both men and women followed a tradition of braiding coloured ribbons into their hair. For footwear, Cuman men and women wore long leather or felt boots with support straps connected to their belt. Both men and women wore cloth or metal arm bands.

When the Cuman–Kipchaks swore oaths, it was done with swords in the hands that touched the body of a dog cut in two. The Italian Franciscan friar, traveler, and historian, John of Plano Carpini, says that when the Hungarian prince married the Cuman princess, ten Cumans swore over a dog cut in half with a sword that they would defend the Kingdom of Hungary. The Christian writer and historian of the crusades, Jean de Joinville (c. 1224–c. 1317), mentions that when the Cumans and Byzantines made an alliance, the Cumans made a dog pass between both sides and cut it with a sword, obliging the Byzantines to do the same; the Cumans said that both they and the Byzantines should be cut in pieces if they failed each other. Joinville described a Cuman noble's funeral: he was buried seated on a chair whilst his best horse and best sergeant were placed beside him alive. 

Prior to this the sergeant was given a large sum of money by the Cuman leaders for the purpose of handing it back to them when they too would come into the afterlife. The Cuman khan also gave a letter of recommendation to the sergeant, which was addressed to the first king of the Cumans, in which the present king testified to the sergeant's good character. After these proceedings a huge mound was raised above the tomb. Cumans were buried in their warrior outfits. Wolves were greatly respected by the Cuman–Kipchaks, and they would sometimes howl along with them in commune. The personal bodyguard of the khan were called Bori (wolf in Turkic). Like other nomadic nations, the Cuman–Kipchaks initiated blood bonds (with the purpose of symbolically cementing a bond) by the drinking or mixing of each other's blood.
Amongst the Cuman–Kipchaks ethnic names often became personal names – this was also practiced amongst the Mongols. This practice involved naming newborns after the names of conquered tribes and people. Names such as 'Baskord' (from the Bashkirs), 'Imek' (from the Kimeks), 'Kitan' (from the Mongol Khitan people), and 'Urus' were used by the Cumans. 

Friar William of Rubruck, a Franciscan traveler who visited the Mongols in 1253–55, provides another account of Cuman customs. He mentions that Cumans built statues for dead notables, facing east and holding a cup (these statues are not to be confused with the balbals, which represent the enemies that were killed by him). He also notes that for richer notables, the Cumans built tombs in the form of houses. Rubruk gives an eyewitness account of a man who had recently died: the Cumans had hung up sixteen horses' hides, in groups of four, between high poles, facing the four points of the compass. The mourners then also placed kumis for the dead man to consume. Other graves had plenty of stones statues placed around them (balbals), with four tall ones placed to face the points of the compass. 

Rubrick also wrote "Here the Cumans, who are called Chapchat [Kipchak] used to pasture their flocks, but the Germans call them Valans and their province Valania, and Isidorus calls (the region stretching) from the river Don as far as the Azov Sea and the Danube, Alania. And this land stretches from the Danube as far as the Don, the borderline of Asia and Europe; one can reach there in two months with quick riding as the Tatars ride.... and this country which extends from the Danube to the Tanais [Don] was all inhabited by the Chapcat Comans, and even further from the Don to the Volga, which rivers are at a distance of ten days' journey...And in the territory between these two rivers [i.e. the Don and the Volga] where we continued our way, the Cuman Kipchaks lived."

For many years before the Mongol invasion, the Cuman–Kipchaks were in ambiguous relationships with their neighbours (often through marital and martial alliances), the Kwarizmians, Byzantines, Georgians, and the Rus'; at a given time they could be at peace with one, at war with another. The Byzantine Empire hesitated to go to war with the Cuman–Kipchaks north of the Danube River; instead, like the Hungarians, they chose to bribe them. Since Kwarizm had more important enemies, they hired the Cuman–Kipchaks for garrison duty. There were numerous ways the Cuman–Kipchaks could make a living as nomadic warriors. One could partake in questing and raiding with their tribe and subsequently keep the spoils. Another avenue was to seek employment as a mercenary in exchange for the guarantee of loot. One could serve in a garrison, although this caused those Cumans to eventually forget their light cavalry skills and become poor infantry. This was fully exploited when the Mongol army destroyed the Cuman–Kipchak garrison in Samarkand. Cuman–Kipchak women fought beside their fellow male warriors. Women were shown great respect and would often ride on a horse or wagon while the men walked.

In their travels, the Cumans used wagons to transport supplies as well as weapons such as mangonels and ballistas. Light felt tents with a frame consisting of wooden laths could be carried on top of wagons and easily be placed on the ground. The windows of the tents were "grilled" in such a way that it was difficult to see in but easy to see out. As the Cumans became more settled, they constructed forts for defence and settlement purposes. The Cuman–Kipchaks used dung for fires when firewood was not available. The Cumans had very strict rules (taboos) against theft, and thus would, without prohibition, loosen their horses, camels, and livestock (sheep, oxen) without shepherds or guards when they were stationary. The law of blood vengeance was common among the Cuman–Kipchaks.
The Cuman calendar was atypical, as it showed neither specific Christian influences nor any trace of the Chinese–Turkic twelve-year animal cycle; it appeared to be an archaic system.

Military tactics 

Up until the late 11th and early 12th centuries, the Cumans fought mainly as light cavalry, later developing heavy cavalry. The main weapons of the Cumans were the recurved and, later, the composite bow (worn on the hip with the quiver), and the javelin, curved sword (a sabre less curved than a scimitar), mace, and heavy spear for lancing. Due to European influence, some of the later period Cumans wielded war hammers and axes. For defense they used a round or almond shaped shield, short sleeved mail armour, consisting of commonly alternating solid and riveted rows, Lamellar armour (iron or leather), leather cuirass, shoulder spaulders, conical or dome shaped iron helmet with a detachable iron or bronze anthropomorphic face plate (gold for princes and khans), and at times a camail suspended from the helmet, consisting of chain or leather. 

The armour was strengthened by leather or felt disks that were attached to the chest and back. The items suspended from the belts were a bow case with bow, a quiver, a knife and a comb. They also wore elaborate masks in battle, shaped like and worn over the face. The Cuman Mamluks in Egypt were, in general, more heavily armed than Mongol warriors, sometimes having body armour and carrying a bow and arrow, axe, club, sword, dagger, mace, shield, and a lance. The Cuman Mamluks rode on larger Arabian horses in comparison to steppe ones.

The commonly employed Cuman battle tactic was repeated attacks by light cavalry archers, facing and shooting to the rear of the horse, then a feigned retreat and skilled ambush. To maintain this tactic to optimum efficiency, the Cumans kept a large number of reserve horses (10–12 remounts) to replace fatigued ones, so that a fresh horse was available at all times. The horsemen used oval shaped stirrups and employed a large bridle for their horses. Another important accessory was a small whip attached to the rider's wrist. Tribal banners were either made of cloth with tribal emblems or dyed horse hair – with more tails signifying greater importance of the warrior or group. Some of the Cumans who moved west were influenced by Western heraldry, and they eventually displayed hybridized European-Cuman heraldry.

Niketas Choniates, while describing a Battle of Beroia in the late 12th century, gave an interesting description of the nomadic battle techniques of the Cumans:

They [The Cumans] fought in their habitual manner, learnt from their fathers. They would attack, shoot their arrows and begin to fight with spears. Before long they would turn their attack into flight and induce their enemy to pursue them. Then they would show their faces instead of their backs, like birds cutting through the air, and would fight face to face with their assailants and struggle even more bravely. This they would do several times, and when they gained the upper hand over the Romans [Byzantines], they would stop turning back again. Then they would draw their swords, release an appalling roar, and fall upon the Romans quicker than a thought. They would seize and massacre those who fought bravely and those who behaved cowardly alike."

Robert de Clari gave another description:

Each one has at least ten or twelve horses, and they have them so well-trained that they follow them wherever they want to take them, and they mount first on one and then on another. When they are on a raid, each horse has a bag hung on his nose, in which his fodder is put, and he feeds as he follows his master, and they do not stop going by night or by day. And they ride so hard that they cover in one day and one night fully six days' journey or seven or eight. And while they are on the way they will not seize anything or carry it along, before their return, but when they are returning, then they seize plunder and make captives and take anything they can get. Nor do they go armed, except that they wear a garment of sheepskin and carry bows and arrows.

Religion 

The Cuman people practiced the shamanistic religion of Tengrism. Their belief system had animistic and shamanistic elements; they celebrated their ancestors and provided the dead with objects whose lavishness was considered an indicator to the recipient's social rank.

The Cumans referred to their shamans as Kam (female: kam katun); their activities were referred to as qamlyqet, meaning "to prophesy". The Cumans used Iranian words to designate certain concepts: uchuchmak (a native Turkic word cognate with Turkish uçuşmak) meaning "fly away, paradise" and keshene meaning "nest" (an Iranian borrowing; the concept was that the soul has the form of a bird).

Funerals for important members involved firstly creating a mound, then placing the dead inside, along with various items deemed useful in the afterlife, a horse (like the Bulgars), and sometimes a servant or slave.

Cuman divination practices used animals, especially the wolf and dog. The dog "It/Kopec" was sacred to the Cuman–Kipchaks, to the extent that an individual, tribe, or clan would be named after the dog or type of dog. Cumans had shamans who communicated with the spirit world; they were consulted for questions of outcomes.

The Cumans in Christian territories were baptised in 1227 by Robert, Archbishop of Esztergom, in a mass baptism in Moldavia on the orders of Bortz Khan, who swore allegiance to King Andrew II of Hungary.

Codex Cumanicus 

The Codex Cumanicus, which was written by Italian merchants and German missionaries between 1294 and 1356, was a linguistic manual for the Turkic Cuman language of the Middle Ages, designed to help Catholic missionaries communicate with the Cumans. It consisted of a Latin–Persian–Cuman glossary, grammar observations, lists of consumer goods and Cuman riddles. The first copy was written in the monastery of St. John near Saray. A later copy (1330–1340) is thought to have been written in a Franciscan friary. Later, different sections of the codex, such as the Interpreter's Book (which was for commercial, merchant use) and the Missionaries' Book (which contains sermons, psalms and other religious texts along with Cuman riddles) were combined. The Interpreter's Book consists of 110 pages; pages 1–63 contain alphabetically arranged verbs in Latin, Persian and Cuman. The Missionaries' Book contains vocabulary listings, grammatical notes, Cuman riddles, religious texts and some Italian verses. The Cuman riddles are the oldest documented material of Turkic riddles and constitute Turkic folklore. Some of the riddles have almost identical modern equivalents (for example Kazakh). The Codex Cumanicus is composed of several Cuman–Kipchak dialects.

The Cumans' language was a form of Kipchak Turkic and was, until the 14th century, a lingua franca over much of the Eurasian steppes. A number of Cuman–Kipchak–Arabic grammar glossaries appeared in Mamluk lands in the 14th and 15th centuries. It is supposed that the Cumans had their own writing system (mentioned by the historian Gyárfás), which could have been a runic script. The supposition that the Cumans had a runic script is also suggested by the academic Hakan Aydemir, who mentioned a buckle with runic writing from a Cuman grave There was also some Khazar Jewish linguistic influence upon the Cumans – the Cuman words shabat and shabat kun (meaning Saturday) are related to the Hebrew word Shabbat (meaning Sabbath). These Hebrew influences in the language may have resulted from contact or intermarriage between Khazars and some of the Cumans in the mid-11th century.

Cuman leaders 

 Iskal or Eskel (compare OTrk 𐰔𐰏𐰠 Izgil, the endonym of a Western Turkic Nushibi tribe who would later join and be assimilated into the Volga Bulgars) who were mentioned by Ahmad ibn Fadlan after visiting Volga region in 921–922. They also were mentioned by Abu Saʿīd Gardēzī in his Zayn al-Akhbār. According to Bernhard Karlgren, Eskels became the Hungarian people Székelys. Yury Zuev thought that Iskal who is mentioned in the Laurentian Codex about the first military encounter of Cumans against the Ruthenians on February 2, 1061, is personification of a tribal name.
 Sharukan/Sharagan (also known as Sharukan the Elder), grand father of Konchak. He was another Polovotsian khan who was victorious against the Ruthenian army of Yaroslavichi at the Alta river (Battle of the Alta River). According to the Novgorod First Chronicle Sharukan was taken as prisoner by Svyatoslav II of Kiev in 1068, while no such information is provided in the Laurentian Codex. In May 1107 along with Bonyak, Sharukan raided a couple of Ruthenian cities (Pereyaslav and Lubny), however already in August of the same year the collective Ruthenian army led by Svyatoslav carried out a devastating defeat to the Cuman Horde forcing Sharukan to flee.
 Bonyak/Maniak, Cuman khan who was actively involved in civil conflicts of Ruthenia. He had a brother Taz who perished at the battle on the Sula River in 1107. Bonyak was last mentioned in 1167 when he was defeated by Oleg of Siveria. Bonyak was a leader of the Cuman tribe Burchevichi that resided in steppes of the East Ukraine between modern cities of Zaporizhia and Donetsk.
 Tugorkan (1028–1096), was mentioned in essays of the Byzantine Princess Anna Komnene along with his compatriot Bonyak. He perished with his son at the battle on the Trubizh River against the Ruthenian army.
 Syrchan, a son of Sharukan. He was a leader of a Cuman tribe that lived on the right banks of Siversky Donets. Chronicles mentioned that after the death of Vladimir II Monomakh, grand prince of Kiev, Syrchan sent out an emissary and a singer Orev to Georgia after his brother Atrak/Otrok (who, with 40,000 Cuman troops, was in Georgia at the time), urging him to return. Khan Otrok agreed (giving up the fame and security he had won in Georgia), after smelling eyevshan, the grass of his native steppe. Syrchan was mentioned in the poem of Apollon Maykov (1821–1897) "Emshan".
 Otrok/Atrak, a son of Sharukan and a brother of Syrchan. In 1111 he, along with his brother, withdrew to the Lower Don region after losing a battle against the Ruthenians. There Atrak's horde joined the local Alans. In 1117 his army sacked Sarkel and 5 other cities belonging to the Torkils and Berendei forcing the local Pechenegs, Berendei and Torkils to flee to Ruthenia. Around the same time Atrak invaded the Northern Caucasus where he entered into conflict with local Circassians pushing them beyond the Kuban River. The conflict was settled by a Georgian King David IV of Georgia who offered military service to Atrak against Seljuks in 1118. David also married the daughter of Atrak – Gurandukht. After withdrawal of Atrak away from the Don region, the Alan's duchy in East Ukraine was liquidated in 1116–17. Atrak returned after the death of Vladimir Monomakh in 1125.
 Khan Konchek/Konchak/Kumcheg (meaning 'trousers'), grandson of Sharukan, son of Khan Otrok. He united the tribes of the eastern Cumans in the later half of the 12th century, after which in the 1170s and 1180s he launched a number of particularly destructive attacks on the settlements in the Duchy of Kiev, the Principality of Chernigov and the Principality of Pereyaslavl. Konchak gave aid to the princes of the Principality of Novgorod-Seversk in their struggle for control with the other Rus' princes. Along with Khan Kobiak/Kobek, Khan Konchak was routed on the Khorol River in 1184 during an assault on Kyivan Rus'. In 1185, he defeated the army of Ihor Sviatoslavych, who was taken as a prisoner. Later, Konchak laid siege to Pereiaslav and ravaged the Chernihiv and Kyiv areas. His daughter married prince Vladimir Igorevich of Putivl (Igor's son). It is hypothesized that Konchek was with the Cumans who helped Riurik Rostislavovich seizure and sack of Kiev in 1202. Khan Konchek is credited with certain technological advancements, such as Greek fire and a special bow that needed 50 men to operate. Konchek was noted by the Rus' to be "greater than all the Cumans". He died in a skirmish that preceded the Battle of Kalka River. The struggle to repel Khan Konchak and his army by Ihor Sviatoslavych and the Rus' princes is immortalized in the epic The Tale of Igor's Campaign ("Slovo o polku Ihorevi)."
 Syrgiannés/Sıçğan It is seen that some of the Cumans, who were on the way to prevent the Seljuk Turks expansion and were taken into Byzantine service after a Mongolian invasion, also served in the imperial palace and rose to high positions in time. As a matter of fact, Syrgiannés (Sytzigan: Sıçğan: Rat), who was the son of one of the Cuman begs, was baptized and married a woman from the Palaiologos family, and later received the title of Megas Domestic. The presence of his descendants in the Byzantine Empire continued for nearly 100 years. The last representative of this The Cuman Family, which was later assimilated into Byzantine Culture was also named Syrgiannés, just like the first member of the family. Syrgiannés, who was the governor of Macedonia and Thrace, was the elder emperor II. After participating in the struggles between Andronikos and his grandson that started in 1320, he fell out of favor and led a dull life until he was killed by the emperor's men in 1334.

Appearance 
The looks of a typical Cuman are a matter of sensationalist debates. This is because in spite of their Eastern origins, several sources point at them being white, blue-eyed, and blond. It is important to elaborate, however, that the full range of available data sketches a more complex picture. While the written sources predominantly emphasize a fair complexion (e.g. Adam of Bremen referring to them as "the blond ones") the craniometric and genetic data, as well as contemporary art, support the image of a people highly heterogenous in appearance. Skulls with East Asian features are often found in burials associated with the Cumans and Pechenegs in Europe. The genetic material is mixed, albeit that European matrilineal DNA predominates (see also below). Unlike the written sources, paintings and miniatures from between the 12th and 14th century (close in time to the settlement of Cumans to Central Europe) tend to support the picture of a mixed population that is suggested by the craniometric and genetic analyses. In the Anjou Legendarium Cumans are depicted with East Asian features and dark hair, while a fresco in the Kraskovo church in Slovakia confirms the stereotype of the blond Cuman. There are also depictions of Cumans with Caucasian features, but dark complexion (e.g. in the Képes Krónika Pictum). Notably, all of these phenotypes can be traced to groups described in Chinese and Arab sources, that are assumed to have later merged in the Cuman–Kipchak confederation. Fair complexion, e.g. red hair and blue or green eyes, were already noted by the Chinese among the Qincha (Kipchak), while the Tiele (to whom the Qun belonged) were not described as foreign looking, i.e. they were likely East Asian in appearance. A dark complexion was attributed to the Pechenegs by Ibn Fadlan, who did not specify, however, if their features are European or Asian. The Kipchak, Qun and Pechenegs all assimilated into the Cuman-Kipchak confederation, eventually.

Legacy

As the Cumans ceased to have a state of their own, they were gradually absorbed into Eurasian populations (certain families in Hungary, Bulgaria, North Macedonia, Turkey, Romania, Georgia, Kazakhstan, Tatars in Crimea). The Cumans in Dobruja were assimilated into Bulgarian and Romanian people. Traces of the Cumans can still be found in placenames stretching from China to the Balkans, such as:
 the city of Kumanovo in North Macedonia;
 a Slavic village named Kumanichevo in the Kastoria region of Greece (renamed to Lithia in 1928);
 a Slavic village named Kumanich in the Drama region of Greece (renamed to Dasoto in 1927);
 Comăneşti in Romania;
 Kuman, a city in Xinjiang, China;
 Polovtsy, a town in Smolensk Oblast, Russia;
 Polovtsy in Mogilev Region, Belarus;
 the steppes north of the Caucasus Mountains, referred to as Kuban as well as the Kuban River;
 the village of Kumane in Serbia;
 the subdivision of Kumanitsa in the municipality of Ivanjica, Serbia;
 the municipality of Kuman in the Fier District, Fier County, southwestern Albania;
 Küman, a village and municipality in the Lerik Rayon of Azerbaijan;
 the town and district of Ulaş in the Sivas Province of Turkey;
 Comana in Northern Dobruja (also Romania);
 the small village of Kumanite in Bulgaria;
 Kuman, a town in Qashqadaryo, Uzbekistan; 
 the town of Kumanlar in Ordu, Turkey; Debrecen in Hungary;
 the village of Bugac in Hungary,
 the counties of Bács-Kiskun and Jász-Nagykun-Szolnok as well as the cities Kiskunhalas and Kunszentmiklós in Hungary,
 the village of Kunmadaras in Greater Cumania, Hungary;
 and the town of Kumanov in Khmelnytskyi Oblast, Ukraine.

Some famous Crimean Tatar historians such as Halil Inalcik and Ilber Ortayli refused to use the term Tatar, Crimean Tatars are direct descendants of Cumans who were settled in Pontic Steppes before the Tatar migration. Historically, Cuman language is considered the direct ancestor of the current language of the Crimean Tatars with possible incorporations of the other languages, like Crimean Gothic.

By the end of the 15th century, the main prerequisites that led to the formation of an independent Crimean Tatar ethnic group were created: the political dominance of the Crimean Khanate was established in Crimea, the Turkic languages (Cuman-Kipchak on the territory of the khanate) became dominant, and Islam acquired the status of a state religion throughout the Peninsula. By a preponderance Cumanian population of the Crimea acquired the name "Tatars", the Islamic religion and Turkic language, and the process of consolidating the multi-ethnic conglomerate of the Peninsula began, which has led to the emergence of the Crimean Tatar people. Over several centuries, on the basis of Cuman language with a noticeable Oghuz influence, the Crimean Tatar language has developed.

The flower, Kumoniga (melilot), is also a relic of the Cumans. According to some historians, Gagauz people may descendant of Cumans; the name Qipcakli occurs as a modern Gagauz surname. The etymology of the Sea of Azov is popularly said to derive from a certain Cuman prince named Azum or Asuf, who was killed defending a town in this region in 1067.

As the Mongols pushed westward and devastated their state, most of the Cumans fled to Hungary, as well as the Second Bulgarian Empire since they were major military allies. The Cuman participation in the creation of the Second Bulgarian Empire in 1185 and thereafter brought about basic changes in the political and ethnic sphere of Bulgaria and the Balkans. Bulgarian Tsar Ivan-Asen II was descended from Cumans and settled them in the southern parts of the country, bordering the Latin Empire and the Despotate of Thessalonica. Those territories are in present-day Turkish Europe, Bulgaria, and North Macedonia.

The Cumans who settled in Hungary had their own self-government in a territory that bore their name, Kunság, that survived until the 19th century. Two regions – Little Cumania and Greater Cumania – exist in Hungary. The name of the Cumans (Kun) is preserved in county names such as Bács-Kiskun, Kunbaja and Jász-Nagykun-Szolnok. The Cumans were organized into four tribes in Hungary: Kolbasz/Olas in upper Cumania around Karcag and the other three in lower Cumania.

The Cuman language disappeared from Hungary in the 17th or 18th century, possibly following the Turkish occupation. The last person who was able to speak some Cumanian on a decaying level was István Varró from Karcag, who died in 1770. During the 1740s, when Cuman was no longer spoken, a Cuman version of the Lord's Prayer suddenly surfaced. It was taught in schools in Greater Cumania and Little Cumania until the mid-20th century, in turn becoming a cornerstone of Cuman identity. In the 20th century enthusiastic self-styled Cumans collected 'Cuman folklore', which consisted of elements such as a traditional Cuman dance, Cuman characteristics such as pride and staunch Calvinism. (By religion, as may be seen by figures for religion in Hungary, the Kiskunság is almost entirely Roman Catholic, whereas in Nagykunság, Protestants do outnumber Catholics, but only narrowly.) This ethnic consciousness was linked to the legal privileges attached to the Cumans' territory. Their 19th-century biographer, Gyárfás István, in 1870 was of the opinion that they originally spoke Hungarian, together with the Iazyges population. Despite this mistake, he has the best overview on the subject concerning details of material used. Cuman influence is also present in the modern Hungarian language in the form of loanwords, particularly in the areas of horse-breeding, eating, hunting and fighting.

In 1918, after World War I, the Cuman National Council was formed in Hungary, which was an attempt to separate the Kunság region (Greater Cumania and Little Cumania) from the Hungarian state, with the aim of forming a new independent Cuman state in Europe. The Cuman National Council declared the independence of Kunság, and elected its president Count Gedeon Ráday on December 18. However the council's efforts remained unsuccessful. In 1939, Cuman descendants organized celebrations for the 700th anniversary of their arrival in Hungary, where they emphasized their separate ethnic existence and identity with ceremonial speeches. In 1995, The Cuman Memorial Site was inaugurated as a tribute to the Cuman ancestors and the redemption of the former Nagykun District. In 2009, and subsequently 2012, a World Meeting of the Cumans was held in Karcag. During the first meeting, which lasted two weeks, academic conferences, historical exhibitions, publications, presentations of traditional and cultural festivals and lectures in relation to the Cumans were held. In the 2012 meeting, the minister for rural development, Sándor Fazekas, mentioned how Cuman traditions are still kept alive, such as costumes, folk songs, and food.

The Cumans appear in Rus' culture in the Rus' epic poem The Tale of Igor's Campaign and are the military enemies of the Rus' in Alexander Borodin's opera Prince Igor, which features a set of Polovtsian Dances.

The name Cuman is the name of several villages in Turkey, such as Kumanlar, including the Black Sea region. The indigenous people in the Altai Republic, Kumandins (Kumandy), are descended from the Cumans.
By the 17th century, the Kumandins lived along the river Charysh, near its confluence with the river Ob. A subsequent relocation to the Altai was driven by their unwillingness to pay yasak (financial tribute) to the Russian sovereign. N. Aristov linked the Kumandins – and the Chelkans – to the ancient Turks, "who in the 6th-8th CC. CE created in Central Asia a powerful nomadic state, which received ... the name Turkic Kaganate".

Persons of Cuman/Kipchak origin also became Mamluk leaders: a prominent Cuman Sultan of the Egyptian Mamluk Sultanate, Sultan Baibars (reigned 1260–1277), defeated King Louis IX of France, and resisted the Mongol invasion, defeating the Mongol army at the Battle of Ain Jalut (1260) and the Battle of Elbistan (1277) (by using the feigned-retreat tactic). Mamluks in the empire retained a particularly strong sense of Cuman identity, to the degree that the biography of Sultan Baibars, as reflected by Ibn Shaddad, focused on his birth and early years in Desht-i-Kipchak ("Steppe of the Kipchaks"/Cumania), as well as enslavement and subsequent travels to Bulgaria and the Near East.

The historian Dimitri Korobeinikov relates how Baibars' story sums up the tragic fate of many Cumans after the Battle of the Kalka River (1223) and the Mongol invasion of Europe (1223–1242). Roman Kovalev states that this story can further be seen as a mechanism for the preservation of a collective memory broadly reflecting a sense of Cuman identity in the Mamluk Sultanate. In the latter part of the 1260s the Mamluks were allied with the Golden Horde against the Ilkhanate. The creation of this specific warrior class, described as the "mamluk phenomenon" by David Ayalon, was of great political importance.

In the Hungarian village of Csengele, on the borders of what is still called Kiskunsag ("Little Cumania"), an archeological excavation in 1975 revealed the ruins of a medieval church with 38 burials. Several burials had all the characteristics of a Cumanian group: richly jeweled, non-Hungarian, and definitely Cumanian-type costumes; the 12-spiked mace as a weapon; bone girdles; and associated pig bones. In view of the cultural objects and the historical data, the archeologists concluded that the burials were indeed Cumanian from the mid-13th century; hence some of the early settlers in Hungary were from that ethnic group. In 1999 the grave of a high-status Cumanian from the same period was discovered about 50 meters from the church of Csengele; this was the first anthropologically authenticated grave of a Cumanian chieftain in Hungary, and the contents are consistent with the ethnic identity of the excavated remains from the church burials. A separated area of the chieftain grave contained a complete skeleton of a horse.

Genetics 

The ethnic origins of the Cumans are uncertain. The Cumans were reported to have had blond hair, fair skin and blue eyes (which set them apart from other groups and later puzzled historians),

A genetic study analyzing putatively Cuman specimens in Hungary determined that they had a high frequency of western Eurasian mitochondrial DNA (mtDNA) lineages. In a 2005 study by Erika Bogacsi-Szabo et al. of the mtDNA of the Cuman nomad population that migrated into the Carpathian basin during the 13th century, six haplogroups were revealed.

One of these haplogroups belongs to the M lineage (haplogroup D) and is characteristic of Eastern Asia, but this is the second most frequent haplogroup in southern Siberia too. All the other haplogroups (H, V, U, U3, and JT) are West Eurasian, belonging to the N macrohaplogroup. Out of the eleven remains, four samples belonged to haplogroup H, two to haplogroup U, two to haplogroup V, and one each to the JT, U3, and D haplogroups. In comparison to the Cumans, modern Hungarian samples represent 15 haplogroups. All but one is a West Eurasian haplogroup [the remaining one is East Asian (haplogroup F)], but all belong to the N lineage. Four haplogroups (H, V, U*, JT), present in the ancient samples, can also be found in the modern Hungarians, but only for haplogroups H and V were identical haplotypes found. Haplogroups U3 and D occur exclusively in the ancient group, and 11 haplogroups (HV, U4, U5, K, J, J1a, T, T1, T2, W, and F) occur only in the modern Hungarian population. Haplogroup frequency in the modern Hungarian population is similar to other European populations, although haplogroup F is almost absent in continental Europe; therefore the presence of this haplogroup in the modern Hungarian population can reflect some past contribution. "The results suggested that the Cumanians, as seen in the excavation at Csengele, were far from genetic homogeneity. Nevertheless, the grave artifacts are typical of the Cumanian steppe culture; and five of the six skeletons that were complete enough for anthropometric analysis appeared Asian rather than European (Horváth 1978, 2001), including two from the mitochondrial haplogroup H, which is typically European. It is interesting that the only skeleton for which anthropological examination indicated a partly European ancestry was that of the chieftain, whose haplotype is most frequently found in the Balkans."

The study concluded that the mitochondrial motifs of Cumans from Csengele show the genetic admixtures with other populations rather than the ultimate genetic origins of the founders of Cuman culture. The study further mentioned, "This may be the result of the habits of the Cumanian nomads. Horsemen of the steppes formed a political unit that was independent from their maternal descent or their language and became members of a tribal confederation. According to legends, Cumanians frequently carried off women from raided territories. So the maternal lineages of a large part of the group would reflect the maternal lineage of those populations that had geographic connection with Cumanians during their migrations. Nevertheless, the Asian mitochondrial haplotype in sample Cu26 may still reflect the Asian origins of the Cumanians of Csengele. However, by the time the Cumanians left the Trans-Carpathian steppes and settled in Hungary, they had acquired several more westerly genetic elements, probably from the Slavic, Ugric, and Turkic-speaking peoples who inhabited the regions north of the Black and Caspian Seas." The results from the Cuman samples were plotted on a graph with other Eurasian populations, showing the genetic distances between them. The Eurasian populations were divided into two distinct clusters. One cluster contained all the Eastern and Central Asian populations and can be divided into two subclusters; one subcluster includes mainly Eastern Asian populations (Buryat, Korean and Kirghiz Lowland populations), and the other subcluster harbors mainly Central Asian populations (Mongolian, Kazakh, Kirghiz Highland and Uyghur populations). The second cluster contained the European populations. Inside the second cluster, based on HVS I motifs, a clear structure was not detectable, but almost all European populations, including the modern Hungarians, assembled in one section with small distances between each other. Cumans were outside this section; they were found to be above the abscissa of the graph – this is the population from the second cluster, which is closest to the East-Central Asian cluster. The modern Cumans of Csengele, Hungary are genetically nearest to the Finnish, Komi and Turkish populations. The modern day Cuman descendants in Hungary are differentiated genetically from the Hungarians and other European populations.

In relation to the Kumandins, Pankratov regarded the Kumandins as being related anthropologically to the Urals, and suggested that they were less East Asian than the Altaians proper. A majority of mitochondrial DNA lines belonged to the North East Asian haplogroups C or D with also a large minority of west Eurasian lineages such as U.

In popular culture 
Cumans appear as one of the civilizations that players can play as in the 2019 strategy game Age of Empires II: Definitive Edition. In addition, players can play a campaign which tells the story of their flight westwards as they retreat from the Mongols.

Cumans appear as antagonists in the 2018 role-playing game Kingdom Come: Deliverance.

Gallery

See also 

 Syrgiannes Palaiologos

 Notable people of Cuman descent
 The Cuman Tsaritsa of Bulgaria
 Roman Catholic Diocese of Cumania
 Andrey Bogolyubsky
 Yuri Dolgorukiy
 Terter clan
 Turkic languages
 Mongol invasion of Rus
 Tatar invasions
 List of Tatar and Mongol raids against Rus'
 History of Romania
 History of Transylvania
 Origin of the Romanians
 Crimean Karaites, an ethnic group with possible Cuman origins
 Madjars
 Bács-Kiskun County
 Romania in the Early Middle Ages
 Judge of the Cumans
 Foundation of Wallachia
 Battle of Adrianople (1205)
 Constantine Euphorbenos Katakalon
 Asen dynasty – dynasty of the Second Bulgarian Empire. Historians claim a Bulgarian, Romanian or Cuman origin
 Terter dynasty
 Anna of Hungary (1260–1281)
 Basarab I of Wallachia
 Darman and Kudelin – Bulgarians of Cuman origin
 Delhi Sultanate – Qutbuddin Aibak, founder of the Delhi sultanate, was a Cuman; redeemed from slavery by Afghan shakh Mahmud Ghuri, he became his governor in Delhi and proclaimed independence after the death of his patron.
 Elizabeth of Hungary, Queen of Serbia -one of the older children of King Stephen V of Hungary and his wife Elizabeth the Cuman
 Elizabeth of Sicily, Queen of Hungary
 Ladislaus IV of Hungary – he was also known as King Ladislas the Cuman, son of Elizabeth the Cuman
 Roman the Great – he waged two successful campaigns against the Cumans
 Shishman of Vidin (Shishman dynasty of the Second Bulgarian Empire is most probably of Cuman origin)
 Yaropolk II of Kiev

References

Footnotes

Citations

Sources

Further reading 
 
  Golubovsky Peter V. (1884) Pechenegs, Torks and Cumans before the invasion of the Tatars. History of the South Russian steppes in the 9th-13th Centuries (Печенеги, Торки и Половцы до нашествия татар. История южно-русских степей IX–XIII вв.) at Runivers.ru in DjVu format.
  Golubovsky Peter V. (1889) Cumans in Hungary. Historical essay (Половцы в Венгрии. Исторический очерк) at Runivers.ru in DjVu format.
 István Vásáry (2005) "Cumans and Tatars", Cambridge University Press.
 Gyárfás István: A Jászkunok Története
 Györffy György: A Codex Cumanicus mai kérdései
 Györffy György: A magyarság keleti elemei
 Hunfalvy: Etnographia
 Perfecky (translator): Galician-Volhynian Chronicle
 Stephenson, Paul. Byzantium's Balkan Frontier: A Political Study of the Northern Balkans, 900–1204, Cambridge University Press, 2000

External links 
 Mitochondrial DNA of ancient Cumanians: culturally Asian steppe nomadic immigrants with substantially more western Eurasian mitochondrial DNA lineages
 Map of migration
 Cuman Royal House

 
Invasions of Europe
History of Kievan Rus'
Medieval Kingdom of Hungary
Medieval Ukraine
Moldova in the Early Middle Ages
Nomadic groups in Eurasia
Romania in the Early Middle Ages
Turkic peoples of Europe
Medieval Russia
Extinct Turkic peoples